Yoel Hernández may refer to:

Yoel Hernández (hurdler) (born 1977), Cuban hurdler
Yoel Hernández (baseball) (born 1980), Venezuelan baseball player